CasaPound Italia (abbr. CPI; "House of Ezra Pound") is an Italian neo-fascist movement and formerly a political party born as a network of far-right social centres arising from the occupation of a state-owned building by squatters in the neighborhood of Esquilino in Rome on 26 December 2003. Subsequently, CasaPound spread with other instances of squatting, demonstrations and various initiatives, becoming a political movement.

As such, in June 2008, CasaPound therefore constituted an "association of social promotion", and assumed its current name CasaPound Italia – CPI; the party's symbol is the "Arrowed Turtle". On 26 June 2019, CasaPound's leader Gianluca Iannone announced CasaPound existence as a political party had ended, going back to its original status of social movement.

History

The first occupation made using the name CasaPound was on 26 December 2003 in Rome, by a group of young people referring to the ONC/OSA area (acronym for "Non-Compliant Occupations and Occupations with a Housing Purpose"), and coming from previous experience of CasaMontag (named after Guy Montag) at the gates of Rome. The building, a state-owned building in via Napoleone III, later has been used as the national headquarters of the movement and the association. In 2010, 23 families and a total of 82 people lived in CasaPound occupied building.

Previously, CasaPound was associated with Tricolour Flame until 2008 but now has its own movement, CasaPound Italy, extending all over Italy with many social centres. While CPI does not recognize the classic definitions of right and left, it is commonly placed in the category of the political groups and movements of the Italian radical right. Casapound is generally self-defined by its followers as Third Position, however.

In 2011 it was estimated that CasaPound Italy had 5,000 members, while in 2017 they reached 6,000. On 13 November 2017, Simone Di Stefano was elected secretary and nominal prime ministerial candidate for the 2018 general election, although the party subsequently formally stated that it hoped Northern League leader Matteo Salvini became Prime Minister.

In order to participate in the 2019 European Parliament election in Italy, an electoral joint list was formed by CasaPound together with United Right. CasaPound leader Simone Di Stefano topped the coalition's list however the coalition was unable to win any seats in the European Parliament. On 26 June 2019, CasaPound's Iannone announced CasaPound existence as a political party had ended, going back to its original status of social movement.

During the 2022 Italian general election, CasaPound supported Italexit, which had a candidate list that included CasaPound members.

Ideology 

One feature of this movement, according to sociologist Emanuele Toscano, is to present a different interpretation of fascism aimed at overcoming the dichotomy of right-left. The political position of CasaPound is based on the fascist Third Position, defined as "extreme-upper-centre" by the movement itself.

The name, inspired by the poet Ezra Pound, refers to his Cantos against usury, criticisms of the economic positions of both capitalism and Marxism, and his membership of the Italian Social Republic. It also gives particular attention to the Manifesto of Verona, the Labour Charter of 1927 and social legislation of fascism. There has been collaboration with the identitarian movement which propagates a white, Christian Europe. The movement also praises the legacy of far-left figures, like Che Guevara and Hugo Chávez.

On social and domestic issues, CasaPound has a strong anti-immigration stance, but lack of homogeneity on other themes. In January 2016, many members of the movement participated in the Family Day, supporting the traditional family idea. In 2017, the establishment of CasaPound expressed support to the same-sex civil unions, advance directive and improvement of the welfare state. The party supports abortion rights. Some activists of the movement expressed antisemitic and xenophobic rhetoric online, but CasaPound both refuses and expels members who support these ideas.

On foreign policy, CasaPound is critical of the European Union, instead supporting a communitarian-nationalist Europe. The Movement was originally both anti-American and anti-Zionist, and started a cooperation with the Lebanese anti-imperialist, anti-Zionist, Shia Islamist party Hezbollah in 2015. However, Di Stefano later said, "we do not have problems with Israel". In 2018, Di Stefano defended Israeli Prime Minister Benjamin Netanyahu's policies regarding repatriation of illegal immigrants to Africa as "undoubtedly excellent", and criticised humanitarian organisations and the United Nations for intervening to prevent them. Di Stefano has expressed support for U.S. President Donald Trump, but requested that he close U.S. military bases in Italy.

Activities

The social centre has its own musical band, Zetazeroalfa, an association of civil protection and promotes sports (hiking, parachuting, diving and other disciplines), union activities, and recreational activities, including a theater company, web radio, web television and a monthly magazine.

CasaPound has promoted initiatives outside the Italian territory through its non-profit organization Solidarité Identités. The activities of the movement have been the subject of attention by some foreign media.

From the period of activity of the first social centre then were organized and cultural meetings with several guests, including writer Nicolai Lilin, the LGBT deputy Paola Concia, an ex-Red Brigades Valerio Morucci, and the Chinese community.

The main CasaPound political proposal is the so-called Mutuo Sociale (Social Mortgage), as a response to the problem of housing which, according to official data, involving approximately 23,000 households throughout Italy. In October 2011, the Lazio Region officially approved it within its "House Plan".

Starting with the 2011 elections CasaPound presented their candidates in local elections in civic lists or centre-right and succeeded in electing its representatives. At regional and national elections of 2013 CasaPound Italy announced that it will present its civic lists throughout Italy.

Youth wing

In 2006, the movement that arose around the first community centre was endowed with its student organization, under the name "Students' Block". Francesco Polacchi is the General Secretary of Students' Block. Their logo resembles that of the British Union of Fascists.

Questions have been submitted by parliamentarians of the Democratic Party about fascist propaganda and the violence of the student movement.

International meetings
Over the years the leaders of CasaPound Italy have been invited to explain its “political model” in many of the major European capitals (Paris, Madrid, London, Lisbon, Brussels, Warsaw) and the organization has been the subject of some reports by foreign media.

In 2011 the Finnish Resistance Movement also invited members of CasaPound to a seminar in Helsinki. The Finnish Resistance Movement represents national socialism. The Finnish Security Intelligence Service researched the connections of the Finnish Resistance Movement to CasaPound after the 2011 Florence shootings.

Symbolic figures

The party's choice of American poet Ezra Pound as a symbol of the movement has caused controversy with his daughter, Mary de Rachewiltz, who claimed it distorts the meaning of Pound's work and represents a "misappropriation" of his image, despite Pound's stated support for fascism.

Electoral results

Italian Parliament

European Parliament

Regional or Provincial Councils

See also
 Far-right social centres
 National Fascist Party
 Social Bastion
 New Force
 Neo-fascism

References

External links

 
 Blocco Studentesco - official website
 CasaPound Nationalist Squat in Rome on YouTube
 The hipster fascists trying to bring Mussolini back into the mainstream on YouTube
 English interview with the leader of Casa Pound

2003 establishments in Italy
Anti-Islam political parties in Europe
Anti-Islam sentiment in Italy
Far-right movements in Europe
Ezra Pound
Islamophobia in Europe
Neo-fascist organisations in Italy
Political movements in Italy
Right-wing anti-capitalism
Social centres
Squats in Italy
Third Position